Coulogne is a commune in the Pas-de-Calais department, region of Hauts-de-France, France.

Geography
A large village of light industry and farming located just 2 miles (3 km) south of Calais city centre, on the D247 road.

Population

Places of interest
 The church of St.Jacques, dating from the nineteenth century.
 The ruins of an ancient château, destroyed in 1560.
 An eighteenth century  sluice-gate.

See also
Communes of the Pas-de-Calais department

References

Communes of Pas-de-Calais
Pale of Calais